Ernst Melchior (26 June 1920 – 5 August 1978) was an Austrian former professional footballer who played as a striker.

Club career
Melchior was born in Villach. He played seven years for Austrian club Austria Wien before moving to France where he played for FC Rouen and FC Nantes.

International career
Melchior made his debut for Austria in an April 1946 friendly match against Hungary and was a participant at the 1948 Summer Olympics He earned 36 caps, scoring 16 goals. His last international was a November 1953 World Cup qualification match against Portugal.

International goals 
Austria score listed first, score column indicates score after each Melchior goal.

Managerial career 

Melchior was manager of Beşiktaş J.K. (Turkey), Fortuna Düsseldorf (Germany), Club Africain (Tunisia) and Rouen (France). He was also the tenth manager of the Luxembourg national football team, in charge for 13 games.

Death and legacy
Melchior died, aged 58, after a long illness in Rouen. In his honour, a gasse (street) in Vienna was named after him.

External links
Profile - Austria Archive

References

1920 births
1978 deaths
Sportspeople from Villach
Footballers from Carinthia (state)
20th-century Austrian people
Austrian footballers
Austria international footballers
Olympic footballers of Austria
Footballers at the 1948 Summer Olympics
FK Austria Wien players
FC Rouen players
FC Nantes players
Expatriate footballers in France
Austrian expatriate sportspeople in France
Austrian expatriate sportspeople in Turkey
Austrian expatriate sportspeople in Luxembourg
Expatriate football managers in Luxembourg
Austrian football managers
Beşiktaş J.K. managers
Fortuna Düsseldorf managers
Jeunesse Esch managers
FC Rouen managers
Luxembourg national football team managers
Club Africain football managers
Association football forwards